George John Robert Gordon (1812-1912) was a British diplomat who served as Minister Plenipotentiary to the Swiss Confederation from 1854 until 1858.

He was born in Maryculter, Aberdeenshire, on 4 March 1812, the oldest child of Alexander Gordon and Albinia Elizabeth Cumberland; and joined the diplomatic service in 1833. He served at Stockholm, Stuttgart, Rio de Janeiro, Hanover and Berne. In Stockholm he was among a group of British residents who helped to set up regular Anglican church services in the city.

On his return to England in 1853, he presented a copy of Piae Cantiones, a collection of mediaeval songs published in Finland in 1582, to the Anglican clergyman and hymnwriter John Mason Neale. The songs were translated and published by Neale, in collaboration with Thomas Helmore, and include now well-known Christmas carols such as In dulci jubilo and Good King Wenceslas.

Gordon married Rosa Justina Young in Rio in 1843 and they had three children:

Cosmo Frederick Maitland Gordon (b.1843) - naval officer
Alicia Albinia Georgiana Gordon (1845-1930) - married as a Gräfin von Dillen−Spiering
Arthur John Lewis Gordon (1847-1918) - British diplomat, married 1885 Caroline Augusta Hamilton Gordon, daughter of Colonel Sir Alexander Hamilton Gordon (1817-1890)

After 30 years of marriage, however, Gordon declared himself a bachelor and married again. He died 1912 in Würzburg.

Notes

1812 births
1902 deaths
Ambassadors of the United Kingdom to Switzerland
Ambassadors of the United Kingdom to Sweden
Ambassadors of the United Kingdom to Paraguay
Ambassadors of the United Kingdom to Uruguay
Ambassadors of the United Kingdom to Germany